Jleana Valentino (born 3 May 1988) is an Italian kickboxer and mixed martial artist. She is the current world champions of Shoot boxing, and European champion of Muay Thai.

Biography
On November 10, 2020 she participated in the Italian program of RAI Giovani e famosi (Young and famous).

Titles and accomplishments
World Association of Kickboxing Organizations
 2014 WAKO-Pro Italy K-1 -52kg Champion

World Fighters Corporation
 2015 WFC European -52kg Champion

Oktagon
 2016 Oktagon 55kg Champion

World Boxing Council Muaythai
 2018 WBC Muaythai European Flyweight (-50kg) Champion

Shoot Boxing
 2018 Shoot Boxing Girls S-Cup Flyweight Tournament Winner

Fight record

|-  bgcolor="#fbb"
| 2021-06-19 || Loss||align=left| Cristina Morales ||  || Marbella, Spain || Decision (Unanimous) || 5 || 3:00
|-
! style=background:white colspan=9 |
|- style="background:#cfc;"
| 2020-01-25|| Win || align="left" | Juliette Lacroix || YOKKAO 45 ||Turin, Italy || TKO (Doctor stoppage)|| 3 || 0:53
|- style="background:#cfc;"
| 2019-12-14|| Win || align="left" | Anta Sanchez || The Night of Kick and Punch 10 ||Milan, Italy || Decision || 3 || 3:00
|-  bgcolor="#fbb"
| 2019-04-29 || Loss ||align=left| Manazo Kobayashi || KNOCK OUT 2019 SPRING || Tokyo, Japan || Decision (Unanimous) || 3 || 3:00
|-  bgcolor="#cfc"
| 2018-07-06 || Win ||align=left| Manazo Kobayashi || Shoot Boxing Girls S-Cup, Tournament Finals || Tokyo, Japan || Decision (Unanimous) || 3 || 3:00
|-
! style=background:white colspan=9 |
|-  bgcolor="#cfc"
| 2018-07-06 || Win ||align=left| Misaki Morita || Shoot Boxing Girls S-Cup, Tournament Semfiinals || Tokyo, Japan || Decision (Unanimous) || 3 || 3:00
|-  bgcolor="#cfc"
| 2018-07-06 || Win ||align=left| MIO || Shoot Boxing Girls S-Cup, Tournament Quarterfinals || Tokyo, Japan || Decision (Majority) || 3 || 3:00

|-  style="background:#fbb;"
| 2018-03-03 || Loss||align=left| Iman Barlow || A Night Of Muay Thai V || Melton Mowbray, England || Decision (unanimous) || 3 || 3:00
|-  bgcolor="#cfc"
| 2018-01-20 || Win ||align=left| Aline Seiberth || The Night of Kick and Punch || Milan, Italy || Decision (Majority) || 5 || 3:00
|-
! style=background:white colspan=9 |
|-  bgcolor="#fbb"
| 2017-07-07 || Loss ||align=left| Rena Kubota || Shoot Boxing Girls S-Cup || Tokyo, Japan || Decision (Unanimous) || 3 || 3:00

|- style="background:#cfc;"
| 2017-06-24|| Win || align="left" | Cindy Silvestre || The Night of Kick and Punch 7 ||Milan, Italy || Decision || 3 || 3:00

|-  bgcolor="#cfc"
| 2016-05-14 || Win ||align=left| Gloria Peritore || La Notte dei Campioni || Lombardy, Italy || Decision (Split) || 5 || 3:00
|-
! style=background:white colspan=9 |
|-  bgcolor="#cfc"
| 2016-02-13 || Win ||align=left| Aicha Amarhoun || Petrosyan Mania || Milan, Italy || Decision (Unanimous) || 5 || 3:00
|-  bgcolor="#cfc"
| 2015-06-20 || Win ||align=left| Mellony Geugjes || || Belgium || Decision (Unanimous) || 5 || 3:00
|-
! style=background:white colspan=9 |
|-  bgcolor="#cfc"
| 2014-06-28|| Win||align=left| Silvia La Notte || 360° Fight Night || Taranto, Italy || Decision (Unanimous) || 3 || 3:00
|-
! style=background:white colspan=9 |
|-  bgcolor="#cfc"
| 2014-05-|| Win||align=left| Eike Beinwachs ||  || Munich, Germany || KO (Knee) || 3 || 

|-  bgcolor="#cfc"
| 2014-03-01 || Win ||align=left| Emy Kougioumtzoglou || WAKO Pro Elite Tournament, Semi Final || Milan, Italy || Decision (Unanimous) || 3 || 3:00

|-  bgcolor="#cfc"
| 2013-12-15 || Win ||align=left| Luana Lorenzoni || King of the Ring || Rimini, Italy || Decision (Unanimous) || 3 || 3:00
|-
| colspan=9 | Legend:    

|-  bgcolor="#fbb"
| 2013-09-30|| Loss ||align=left| Sanja Sucevic || 2013 WAKO World Championships, Quarter Final || Brazil || Decision || 3 || 2:00 

|-
| colspan=9 | Legend:

Mixed martial arts record

|-
|
|align=center| 
|Haidy Ahmed
|
|Centurion Fight Championship: REX DESERTI
|
|align=center| 
|align=center| 
|Dubai, UAE
|
|-
|Win
|align=center| 1–1
|Adelasia Chilleri
|Decision (unanimous)
|Centurion Fight Championship: Ad Maiora
|
|align=center| 3
|align=center| 5:00
|La Valletta, Malta
|
|-
|Loss
|align=center| 0–1
|Rena Kubota
|Submission (armbar)
|Rizin World Grand-Prix 2015: Part 2 - Iza
|
|align=center| 2
|align=center| 3:31
|Saitama, Japan
|
|-

See also
 List of female kickboxers

References

External links
 
 

1988 births
Living people
Italian female kickboxers
Italian female mixed martial artists
Mixed martial artists utilizing Muay Thai
Mixed martial artists utilizing shootboxing
Italian Muay Thai practitioners
Female Muay Thai practitioners
Sportspeople from Varese